Nikolsk is a rural locality (a selo) and the administrative center of Nikolsky Selsoviet, Zmeinogorsky District, Altai Krai, Russia. The population was 280 as of 2013. There are 7 streets.

Geography 
Nikolsk is located 35 km northwest of Zmeinogorsk (the district's administrative centre) by road. Kuzminka is the nearest rural locality.

References 

Rural localities in Zmeinogorsky District